Coffeyville Municipal Airport  is a city-owned public-use airport four miles northeast of Coffeyville, in Montgomery County, Kansas, United States.

Facilities

For the 12-month period ending September 19, 2005 the airport had 5,550 aircraft operations, average 15 per day: 99% general aviation and 1% military. 40 aircraft were then based at the airport: 85% single-engine, 10% multi-engine and 5% ultralight.

History
 For the World War II use of the airport, see Coffeyville Army Airfield

During World War II the facility was Coffeyville Army Airfield. It was a United States Army Air Forces AAF Flying Training Command training field from 1942 to 1945.

Aircraft used were Vultee BT-13A Valiants and BT-15s. The airfield performed Basic Pilot School instruction, the second phase of the three-phase training program for pilots. The facility was closed and turned over to civil authorities in 1947.

From 1951 to 1954 Ozark Airlines DC-3s between Tulsa and Kansas City stopped at Coffeyville; the airport was then called McGugin Field. National Air Transport's timetable showed a stop at Coffeyville in the 1930s, but that was an earlier airport.

In the 1950s Continental Can Company leased the hangars at the airport and was a subcontractor for Boeing Corporation, building bomb bay doors for B-52 Stratofortresses. This ended in 1958 with the completion of the B-52 contract. Coffeyville had been an industrious small city; this plant closing along with the closing of other industries was a severe blow to Coffeyville's financial health.

In its heyday Coffeyville had a dairy, Page Milk Company; an oilfield drilling rig company, Parkersburg; two railroad yards and maintenance operations, ATSF & Katy; a brick company and terra cotta roofing tile company, Ludawece Celadon; a cast iron casting company; and a large oil refinery, Co-Op. On the northwest outskirts was a large smelter. Except for the oil refinery, which has a small operation today, all industries are gone.

See also
 List of airports in Kansas

References

External links

1942 establishments in Kansas
Airports established in 1942
Airports in Kansas
Buildings and structures in Montgomery County, Kansas